James McGrath was an Irish-born American politician who served as a member of the Wisconsin State Assembly from 1865 to 1874.

Early life 
McGrath was born on March 15, 1836, in Ireland. He later resided in Milwaukee, Wisconsin.

Career
McGrath was a member of the Assembly during the 1865, 1866, 1867, 1868, 1870, 1873 and 1874 sessions. A Democrat while he was a member, he lost to Edward Keogh as an Independent in 1875.

References

Irish emigrants to the United States (before 1923)
Politicians from Milwaukee
Members of the Wisconsin State Assembly
Wisconsin Democrats
Wisconsin Independents
1836 births
Year of death missing